The Treaty of El Pardo may refer to:

Treaty of El Pardo (1728)
Treaty of El Pardo (1739), commonly referred to as the Convention of Pardo
Treaty of El Pardo (1761)
Treaty of El Pardo (1778)
Treaty of El Pardo (1786)